Nand Nagri is the administrative headquarters of both the North East Delhi district and Shahdara district in Delhi. It is situated near the Uttar Pradesh border and has several parks, a government school.

History 
In 1977 this colony had a different name at that time some part Dilshad garden, Nand Nagri, Sundar Nagri are same but because of some reason they divide into three-part Janta flat, Sundar Nagri and Nand Nagri and also maximum Muslim population peoples live in Sundar Nagri, higher society people in Janta flat and maximum population of Hindu live in Nand Nagri.

Population 
The maximum population is Hindu, some Muslim and another religious.

References 

Neighbourhoods in Delhi